REX or Radio Science Experiment is an experiment on the New Horizons space probe to determine various aspects of the atmosphere of Pluto during the 2015 flyby.

Experiment 
Experiment was designed with several goals including determination of pressure and temperature of Plutonian atmosphere, measurements of a possible ionosphere of Pluto and Charon, recording thermal emission temperatures, and taking more accurate chord lengths of Charon and Pluto.

To accomplish the goals, as the spacecraft passed by Pluto, it was targeted on a path that took it behind the dwarf planet in relation to where Earth is, and at that time radio signals from the flyby spacecraft passed through atmosphere of body, and from this various aspects could be determined. REX also is designed to take measurements of the atmospheric conditions at Pluto's moon Charon as part of the mission. REX utilizes an ultrastable oscillator, various electronics, and radio hardware aboard the New Horizons spacecraft. REX utilizes the X-band radio uplink on the spacecraft.

REX hardware weights 160 g (0.16 kg) and consumes 1.6 watts of spacecraft electrical power. It also makes use of other NH hardware, overall key hardware components for REX include:

 high-gain antenna
 low-noise X-band receiver
 ultrastable oscillator

To take the measurements, REX communicates with the Deep Space Network on Earth.

Observation goals:
temperature profiles of Pluto's atmosphere
pressure profiles of Pluto's atmosphere
radiometric temperature
gravitational moments 
ionosphere structure

Extended mission
REX is also planned for use in the New Horizons post Pluto extended mission, including the 486958 Arrokoth flyby. REX will be used to take thermal measurements of the Kuiper belt body during the planned flyby. REX is also used to study the amount of electrons in outer space in the Kuiper belt region. The Kuiper belt is a ring of orbiting bodies between approximately 30 to 55 AU (Earth-Sun distances), home to Pluto and short-period comets it is estimated to consist of hundreds of thousand if not millions of small icy objects. The belt was discovered starting in 1992, and can be studied more closely by the New Horizons mission which is passing through it starting in the late 2010s.

During the post Pluto cruise, REX is usually turned on monthly to measure the electron density of the solar wind between Earth and the spacecraft. When New Horizons flew by Pluto in 2015, it was at about 32.9 AU from the Sun, and about 43.6 AU for the New Year's Day 2019 flyby of Arrokoth.

The timing of the Arrokoth flyby was adjusted in part to aid the use of the REX experiment, in particular time it so more radar dishes on Earth could be used for this experiment.

Data from REX
Using REX radio occultation data the diameter of Pluto was found to be  in a 2017 paper.

See also
Gravity science (Juno) (Experiment aboard Juno Jupiter orbiter that uses radio and time)
Mariner 4 (radio experiment helped determine more accurate atmospheric conditions about Mars in the 1960s)

References

External links
NASA - REX

New Horizons
Spacecraft instruments